Jiangle County is a county of western Fujian province, People's Republic of China. It is under the administration of Sanming City.

Administrative divisions
Towns:
Guyong, Wan'an, Gaotang, Bailian, Huangtan, Shuinan

Townships:
Guangming Township, Moyuan Township, Nankou Township, Wanquan Township, Anren Township, Dayuan Township, Xufang Township

Climate

Transportation
 Xiangtang–Putian Railway

References

 
County-level divisions of Fujian
Sanming